Telčice is a small settlement in the Municipality of Sevnica in central Slovenia. It lies north of Škocjan in the historical region of Lower Carniola. The municipality is now included in the Lower Sava Statistical Region.

References

External links
Telčice at Geopedia

Populated places in the Municipality of Sevnica